The porthole tree frog (Charadrahyla taeniopus) is a species of frog in the family Hylidae endemic to Mexico. Its natural habitats are subtropical or tropical moist montane forests and rivers. It is threatened by habitat loss.

Citations

General references
 

Charadrahyla
Amphibians described in 1901
Taxa named by Albert Günther
Taxonomy articles created by Polbot